In Islam, the Day of judgement is preceded by "signs" ( alāmāt al-sā'a, also ishārāt al-sāʿa) or portents of its arrival. 
Judgment Day, also known as the Final Judgement, ( or ), itself is the time when all human beings are raised from the dead to be judged by God as to whether they shall spend eternity in heaven or hell. Belief in the existence of Judgment Day is considered a fundamental tenet of faith by all Muslims, and one of the six articles of faith.

While interpretations of what the Quran and hadith say about the end times are  "diverse and complex", the signs of Judgment Day's arrival include disruptions in  the order of both human  morality and the natural world; but also the appearance of the savior(s) Mahdi and Jesus, which  "is seen to represent the ultimate victory of the ummah of Islam ... in some senses". Piety will be lost as music, wine drinking, usury, fornication, homosexuality, and disobedience by wives abounds; and the earth will be destroyed. However during this era ʿĪsā (Jesus) and the Mahdi will also vanquish the AntiChrist figure al-Dajjāl, while God will eliminate the monstrous Gog and Magog) liberating the world from injustice and restoring sharia.

The signs have been divided into minor and major by commentators and reported in various ḥadīth collections. and described in commentaries of various medieval Muslim scholars, including al-Ghazali, Ibn Kathir, and Muhammad al-Bukhari, among others.  Islamic apocalyptic literature describing Armageddon (or fitna) is often known as Al-Malhama Al-Kubra (The Great Epic), or (in Shia Islam) Ghaybah (Occultation).

Sources
The trials and tribulations associated with it are detailed in both the Quran and the hadith, (sayings of Muhammad) which are "diffuse and fragmented". These are elaborated on in  creeds, Quranic commentaries (tafsịrs), and theological writing, eschatological manuals and
commentaries of the Islamic expositors and scholarly authorities such as al-Ghazali, Ibn Kathir, Ibn Majah, Muhammad al-Bukhari, and Ibn Khuzaymah who explain them in more detail.
The signs and many other social aberrations are detailed in such works as Muḥammad ibn
Rasūl al-Ḥusaynī al-Barzinjī's al-Ishā'a li-ishrāṭ al-sā'a, and Mishkāt al-maṣābīḥ  Muqaddimah by Ibn Khaldiin, is said to introduce "a full and detailed discussion of the various theories regarding the mahdi and the traditions considered most authoritative in relation to it."

Quran
Many verses of the Quran, especially the earlier ones, are dominated by the idea of the nearing of the Day of Resurrection. 

Indication that there will be signs of its coming are found in Q.47:18:

Interest in end times 

Traditionally interest in "apocalyptic speculation" was strongest among mainstream Shia (Twelver Shia), Isma'ili Islam, Sunni on the "doctrinal and geographic margins" -- such as present day Morocco -- but was weaker in the heartland of Sunni Islam.
Various eschatological interpretations exist within Shia Islam. The concept of seven celestial Hells, as well as the idea that one's souls temporarily wait in either Paradise or Hellfire until the End Times, are accounted for throughout Isma'ili Shi'i literature. Shia tradition broadly tends to recognize the coming of the Mahdi as signifying punishment to come for non-believers.

Minor signs 

The Minor or Lesser Signs (Ashraat al-Saa'ah al-Sughra) are </ref>  According to one Salafi source IslamQA.info, "For the most part", these signs will have occurred a long time before the Resurrection begins. Some of them have already happened – although they may be repeated; some of them  are currently occurring; and some have not yet taken place but will.

One source, Islam House, lists 50 signs, 10 of which "are past, 13 are present and 27 are future". Islamic Finder website, lists 48 signs, 9 of which are past, 13 "are happening at present", and 26 are "yet to happen". Islam Question and Answer lists 28 Minor Signs and 10 major signs. Islam Online lists similar numbers: 10 past, 13 "Present?", 27 future.

Some of these signs tend to be so general that "it is possible to find indicators of them in any modern society (for example, crime, natural disaster, etc.)".

The appearance of the Mahdi, (a messiah figure) is said to be a link between the minor and major signs. In the ḥadīth literature, it is mentioned that minor signs will occur first, then the Mahdi will come and then the major signs. There is debate over whether they could occur concurrently or must be at different points in time. Some sources divide the signs not into minor and major, but into those that have already occurred, that are happening at present, and that are yet to happen.

Events that [it is argued] have already taken place
 The sending of the Prophet;
 The death of the Prophet;
 The appearance of fire in the Hijaz, (which appeared in the mid-7th century AH)
 Splitting of the moon;
 A form of death, which will kill thousands of Muslims;
 A major fighting in Madinah (understood to be the battle of al-Harrah during the caliphate of Yazid);
 The Muslim conquest of Jerusalem;
 The Muslim conquest of Constantinople;
 Two large groups of Muslims will fight in a war;
 A war between the Muslims and a reddish people with small eyes, wearing sandals made of hair;
 A peace agreement between the Muslims and non-Muslims from the yellow race (understood to be the Chinese, Mongols etc.)
 30 impostors will appear, each thinking he is a prophet;
 The spread of literacy.

Events that [it is argued] are happening at present
 Naked, destitute, barefoot shepherds will compete in building tall buildings;
 The slave-woman will give birth to her master or mistress 
 A trial (fitnah) which will enter every Arab household; 
 Knowledge will be taken away (by the death of people of knowledge), and ignorance will prevail; 
 Wine (intoxicants, alcohol) will be drunk in great quantities;
 Zina will become widespread 
 Earthquakes will increase;
 Time will pass more quickly;
 Tribulations (fitna) will prevail;
 Bloodshed will increase;
 A man will pass by the grave of another and wish he was in the latter’s place;
 Trustworthiness will be lost, i.e. when authority is given to those who do not deserve it;
 People will gather for prayer, but will be unable to find an imam to lead them;
 Commerce and business will increase significantly until a woman assists her husband.

Signs that may or may not have already happened, are currently happening, or are yet to happen
 Widespread wealth and lack of need for charity;
 The emergence of claimants to prophethood, such as the liar Musaylimah and al-Aswad al-‘Anasi.
 Musical instruments will become prevalent;
 Killing will become widespread; 
 Appearance of women who are clothed yet naked; 
 Wild animals and inanimate objects will speak to people;
 a man will have to obey his wife and disobey his parents; 
 men will have to work for women;
 a woman will go on the pilgrimage with other women but unaccompanied by a man; 
 there will be complete sexual license;
 The number of males will decrease so that women will outnumber men fifty to one;
 The abandonment of the Jizya tax, of which Dhimmis stop submitting and refuse to pay the tax.

 Events that are yet to happen [not including the Greater signs]
 The number of men will decrease, whilst the number of women will increase, until for every man there are 50 women;
 The Euphrates will reveal a treasure of gold, and many will die fighting over it, each one hoping to be the one who gains the treasure;
 The Romans will come to a place called A’maq or Wabiq, and an army of the best people will go forth from Madinah to face them;
 The Muslim conquest of Rome;
 Men and women partake in sihr and shirk; they travel the world through attaching themselves to the jinn, causing mischief;
 Unless their leaders rule according to the Quran and seek all good from that which God has revealed, God will cause them to fight one another;
 The conquest of Constantinople without weapons;
 The Earth rapidly vomiting gold and silver.
 A cruel ruler from the Mawali of Qahtan named al-Jahjah.
 Houses adornments resembling painted garments.

However, not all these signs are based on reliable hadiths and if one of them is based on a reliable hadith, it should not necessarily be treated as a commandment or a prohibition.

Greater signs
Following the second period, the third will be marked by the ten major (aka greater) signs known as alamatu's-sa'ah al-kubra (the major signs of the end).
These signs offer "more detail" in their accounts of the final days, but there is "considerable variation" in the different versions of these stories.

According to Jessica Stern, a "few elements are consistent": 
"Constantinople will be conquered by Muslims";  
"the Antichrist will appear and travel to Jerusalem";  
"a messianic figure (in some instances Jesus, and in some instances the Mahdi) will come to earth",  
"kill the Antichrist",  and 
"convert the masses to Islam";  
"the world’s non-Muslim territories will be conquered."

 
According to scholar Jean-Pierre Filiu, the collections of hadith Sahih Muslim "organizes the chronology of the major signs and portents of the Hour, organizing  the in a sequence of ten events."
"the first will be three entombments" (khasf) (also called "sinking of the earth" or earthquakes or landsides) where "the earth will open up and people will be buried alive" 
 the first entombment will be in the East;
 the 2nd entombment in the West;
 the 3rd  in the Arabian Peninsula;
 the appearance of smoke; forming a huge black cloud  (dukhan) that covers the earth
 the appearance of the antichrist. This false messiah, Dajjal, shall appear as an apostle of God,  appearing to have great powers as a one-eyed man with his right eye blind and deformed like a grape. Although believers will not be deceived, he will claim to be God, to hold the keys to heaven and hell, and will lead many astray. In reality, his heaven is hell, and his hell is heaven. The Dajjal will be followed by seventy thousand Jews of Isfahan wearing Persian shawls;
 the Beast of the Earth (Dabbat al-Ard) will crawl out of the earth  to talk to people;
 followed by Gog and Magog will break out of their imprisonment "isolating them from the civilized world and run wild";  They will ravage the earth, drink all the water of Lake Tiberias, and kill all believers in their way. Isa, Imam Al-Mahdi, and the believers with them will go to the top of a mountain and pray for the destruction of Gog and Magog. God eventually will send disease and worms to wipe them out.
 the rising of the sun in the west;<
 a "supernatural fire originating in Yemen";
 this fire will drive the human race to the place of the final judgement.

Some other events mentioned in other hadith as signs following the appearance of the Mahdi include:
 The return of Isa (Jesus), from the fourth sky, to kill Dajjal.
 A major war between the Muslims (including Jews and Christians who believe Jesus is a  prophet and Muslim and not divine after his return) led by the Imam Mahdi, and the Jews plus other non-Muslims led by the Antichrist;
 A time of great peace and serenity during and after the remaining lifetime of Jesus (Sahih Bukhari, Vol 3: book 43: 656)
 Arabia will become a land of gardens and rivers;
 Society will then decay;
 The buttocks of the women of the tribe of Daws will again sway in circumambulation (tawaf) around the idol Dhul-Khulsah;
 A gentle wind which will take the souls of the believers;
 There is no-one left on the earth saying, "God, God" or "There is no god except Allah."

Al Dajjal

Al-Masih ad-Dajjal (is a false Messiah, sometimes described as the Islamic AntiChrist, who will appear as the first of the "Greater Signs" of apocalypse. He will be preceded by a terrible drought and present himself as a savior to the starving masses, many of whom –  Bedouins, weavers, magicians, and children of fornication, and especially Jews.—will be taken in by his claims and join his ranks.  
He will emerge from the east, be blind in one eye with his other eye protruding, (an indication that he has been given powers to achieve evil goals). On his forehead or between his eyes are the letters K-F-R (the root of Kafir, i.e. unbeliever)  which every Muslim would be able to read." Like ʿĪsā (Jesus), he will be able to perform miracles – healing the sick, raising the dead, causing the earth to grow vegetation, causing livestock to prosper and to die, and stopping the sun's movement – but unlike Jesus he will do this with the assistance of an army of demons (Shayāṭīn).  He will travel the whole world entering every city, except Mecca and Medina. His army will kill and conquer,  until they corner the Mahdi and a group of just 5000 Muslim fighters in Jerusalem.  In this final battle before the Day of Judgment Jesus will descend from heaven to save the Muslim army, killing infidels simply be breathing on them and defeating and killing  the dajjal simply by looking at him – or looking at him and putting a sword through him. The dajjal will melt away. Sources disagree over whether the Dajjal is human or a devil (shayṭān) in human form.

Gog and Magog

Gog and Magog are mentioned in two chapters of the Quran – Al Kahf and Al-Anbiya – where they are referred to as Yajuj and Majuj. (They are also mentioned in the bible and "are a recognized part of Middle Eastern mythology") They are suppressed by a figure called Dhul-Qarnayn – "the two-horned one." Dhul-Qarnayn, having journeyed to the ends of the world, meets "a people who scarcely understood a word" who seek his help in building a barrier that will separate them from the people of Yajuj and Majuj who "do great mischief on earth". (In Islamic literature Yajuj and Majuj are  "described as cannibals with varying degrees of height and breadth", or sometimes depicted "as large and sometimes as small, but they are always numerous and subhuman". 
Dhul-Qarnayn agrees to build it for them, but warns that when the time comes (believed to mean the end times), God will remove the barrier.
  Journalist Graeme Wood reports that in Islamic apocalyptic literature Gog and Magog are a subhuman pestilence who are released from thousands of years of imprisonment sometime after Isa's  descent to earth. After much killing, pillaging and devouring of vast resources they are wiped out after "God commands an insect or worm to burrow into their necks and kill them".

Sufyani

The Sufyani is an evil figure in Islamic eschatology. According to hadith, Sufyani will be a tyrant who will spread corruption and mischief. According to Shia hadith, Sufyani will rise in the month of Rajab. The predicted location of his arrival is in Damascus.

Sufyani is a distinctly different individual than Dajjal. It is said that he will kill children and rip out the bellies of women. The Sufyani will murder those from the household of the Prophet and will rule over Syria. When the Mahdi appears, Sufyani will send an army to seize and kill him. However, when Sufyani and his army would reach the desert of Bayda, they would be swallowed.

The Mahdi

Mahdi, meaning "Rightly Guided One" is a messianic figure in Islamic tradition who will "rid the world of bid'ah (innovation), reestablish Sunnah and teach religion...". The word Mahdi does not appear in the Quran (al-hadī, or "guide" appears twice), but is found in hadiths and is said to be the sign between Minor signs and Major signs of Day of Resurrection. Some Shia Muslims regard him as the first sign of the third period. Hadith reports state that he will be a descendant of Muhammad through Muhammad's daughter Fatimah and cousin Ali's son Hassan. According to Shias, Mahdi will be looked upon to kill Dajjal to end the disintegration of the Muslim community, and to prepare for the reign of Isa (Jesus), who will rule for a time thereafter. According to Sunnis, Mahdi will be against Dajjal and will have some Muslim communities in Shaam and that Jesus will return to kill Dajjal. The Mahdi will fulfill his prophetic mission, a vision of justice and peace, before submitting to Jesus' rule. The physical features of Mahdi are described in the hadith; he will be of Arab complexion, of average height, with a big forehead, large eyes, and a sharp nose. He will have a mole on his cheek, and be recognized by the Muslim community while he sits in his own home. As written by Abu Dawud, "Our Mahdi will have a broad forehead and a pointed (prominent) nose. He will fill the earth with justice as it is filled with injustice and tyranny. He will rule for seven years." Other sources say five or nine years. In some accounts, his reign will be followed by a cold wind causing everyone with the smallest measure of human-kindness or faith, to die and be carried straight to heaven. Therefore, only the wicked will remain and be victims of terrible animals and Shayateen, until the day of resurrection.

Though the predictions of the duration of his rule differ, hadith are consistent in describing that God will perfect him in a single night, imbuing him with inspiration and wisdom, and his name will be announced from the sky. The Mahdi will bring back worship of true Islamic values, and bring the Ark of the Covenant to light. He will conquer Constantinople and Mount Daylam and will regard Jerusalem and the Dome as his home. His banner will be that of Muhammad: black and unstitched, with a halo. Furled since the death of Muhammad, the banner will unfurl when the Mahdi appears. He will be helped by angels and others that will prepare the way for him. He will understand the secrets of abjad.

Descent of Jesus 

Islamic literature predicts that the Mahdi will be followed and assisted in his fight against evil "by a bygone prophet who will come back to earth". This prophet will not be Muhammad (as non-Muslims might expect) but ʿĪsā (Jesus), 'praised in the Quran as the Messiah and the “Word of God.”'  "The usual interpretation" of the prophecy of Jesus's return to earth is that He "will put an end to his own worship, symbolized by the cross, and re-establish the dietary laws that Christianity abandoned but Jews and Muslims still observe."  
While the Quran is not explicit about Jesus' return, many Muslims believe that two Quranic verses suggest his second coming during the end times. The verse that is the basis of Islamic belief that Jesus did not die on the cross, but ascended into heaven:  
"And [for] their saying, 'Indeed, we have killed the Messiah, Jesus, the son of Mary, the messenger of God.' And they did not kill him, nor did they crucify him; but [another] was made to resemble him to them. And indeed, those who differ over it are in doubt about it. They have no knowledge of it except the following of assumption. And they did not kill him, for certain." (Q.4:157:) 
The other verse connects Jesus in some way with "the Hour": 
"And indeed, Jesus will be [a sign for] knowledge of the Hour, so be not in doubt of it, and follow Me. This is a straight path". (Q.43:61)." 
Tabari, author of one of the most important Sunni tafsirs, argues that the verse refers to Jesus, who will unite all believers under the banner of Islam. (There is no mention of ʿĪsā from Q.43:58-62, though an ambiguous maale signular pronoun "he" is used.) Hadiths further elaborate the events following Jesus arrival. According to Sahih al-Bukhari and a number of other hadith, Jesus will descend among Muslims, "break the cross, kill (or slaughter) the pig and abolish (or remove) the Jizya". Although traced back to Abu Hurairah, one of the sahaba, such hadiths might actually have been introduced later during civil wars in the early Abbasid Caliphate, when a savior was expected. While for Shias, the Mahdi will be the savior, some Sunnis tended to expect Jesus' return. (Other sources expect Isa is the Mahdi, "mahdi" meaning "the divinely-guided one", a title rather than a distinct person). During the early Abbasid Caliphate, wearing crucifixes in processions and holding pigs in public, was forbidden. Otherwise, the breaking of the cross, might reflect general disapproval of this symbol by Muslims, and slaying pigs a reference to Jesus exorcism of Legion.

Jesus in Shia Islam

For Shia, the return of Jesus is considered the third major sign of the last days (along with the appearance of the Mahdi and Jesus's nemesis Masih ad-Dajjal). Like Sunni Muslims, Shia believe in the Hadith describing the return of the Mahdi that will coincide with the return of Isa, who will serve  as a just judge before the Day of Judgment.  Although Muhammad is the preeminent prophet in Islam, Jesus is mentioned in the Quran, and so is Idris (Enoch), who is said not to have died but to have been raised up by God.

Isa will descend from the heavens in al-Quds at dawn, meet with the Mahdi, whose appearance has preceded Isa, and who will lead the people in fajr prayer. After the prayer, they will open a gate to the west to confront and defeat Masih ad-Dajjal.  Isa will then lead a peaceful forty-year reign until his death, and be buried in a tomb beside Muhammad in Medina.

 What will be your reaction when the son of Mary (Jesus) descends and your Imam is from among yourselves?

Version of timeline (Sunni)
Interpretations of the Quran and hadith by Muslims to determine what happens and when (or how much it matters) leading up to Judgement Day vary. (Some examples: will the Dajjal be killed by the Mahdi, or by Jesus? Will  the Sufyani appear in end times? (Sunnis say no or are doubtful; Shia say yes.) Will the Mahdi work with Jesus? or be Jesus?  How long will the Mahdi and Jesus reign? And how long after their deaths will the earth come to an end? (estimates in Islamic eschatological literature "have varied greatly"). Will there even be a Mahdi? (He is not mentioned in the Quran, the two most-revered Sunni hadith collections of Sahih al-Bukhari and Sahih Muslim, or several famous creeds (ʿAqīda by al-Ash'arī, al-Nasafī, Al-Tahawi, and Abu Ḥanīfa, etc.) that mention other famous apocalyptic characters and events.)

Are the worshippers of the pre-Islamic Arabian goddess al-Lat the Shia Hezbollah (as the Islamic State does)? Who is Rûm (the term meaning "Romans" historically used by Muslims to refer to the Eastern Roman Empire ("Byzantines") and geographically Asia Minor)? the Vatican, Italy, Europe, NATO, Russia, the United States, the Turkish Republic? (The Turkish Ottoman Empire conquered the remnants of the Byzantine Empire, which called itself the Roman Empire, and the Turkish Republic took over the heart of the Ottoman Empire),  have all been suggested.

Muslims who believe "the hour" is nigh are very interested in the details of "the signs". 
Journalist Graeme Wood has put together a summary of end time events as interpreted by one such group—Sunni jihadis supporters of the Islamic State—based on conversations with an Islamic State "cleric" Musa Cerantonio and other Jihadist Muslims, as well as apocalyptic literature cited by scholar of Islamic eschatology, Jean-Pierre Filiu. (The Islamic State features predictions about the signs of the hour in its magazine Dabiq.)

Lesser Signs
Supporters (like many Muslims) believe many of  the Lesser Signs have already occurred—such as "a slave giving birth to her master" (having occurred in the Islamic State among enslaved women who give birth to a child fathered by a jihadi who went on to be killed in combat, the child inheriting the rights of the father), an embargo of Iraq, leadership of Muslim nations by unworthy miscreants, a war between Muslims and Jews, worship of the pre-Islamic Arabian goddess al-Lat, naked shepherds will build tall buildings, mass importation of non-Muslims to Muslim lands (guest workers in the Gulf States and Saudi), and lax moral standards (rampant fornication, alcohol consumption, listening to music).

Next will occur a number of great battles and terrible events, along with weird and horrible natural disasters. The Euphrates will divert itself and reveal "mountains of gold", which Muslims should either not touch or take only a small amount. The earth will open up and swallow people. Smoke will appear. The caliphate will be revived, but Islam will not be united as many "false prophets and deviants" cause discord.

During or around this time there will be two titanic battles between Muslims and their enemies; First the enemy -- "united behind 80 banners" and led by Rum, will fight Muslims at Dabiq, (in what is now northern Syria). One-third of the world's Muslims will be killed as martyrs, and another third will desert, fleeing the battle, and the remaining third will advance to Rum and sack it.

This will be followed by "the Great Slaughter" (Al-Malhama Al-Kubra), a battle "the likes of which has never been seen", pitting the Muslim world against "everyone else", with Muslim readers of eschatology disagreeing on what prophesies say about the result.

Greater Signs
At this point, the first of the "Greater Signs" will commence,  a terrible drought that will leave one third of the world without rain for a year, and  two-thirds  without the next year. Into this calamity the al masih al dajjal (the "False Messiah" or Anti-Christ),  will appear, providing food for the starving, rain for the thirsty, having been granted the ability (by God) to perform miracles.  Presenting himself as a saviour to the world's starving masses, millions or even billions will fall at his feet in gratitude. Blind in one disfigured eye that protrudes "like a grape", with kafir imprinted on his forehead, he will not deceive  true Muslims.

The Anti-Christ will raise an army of his supporters, especially women and Iranian Jews. Wandering the planet, killing and conquering, its power will be so great it will send "Muslims into hiding". Finally a small force of 5000 Muslim fighters will be cornered by his armies in Jerusalem", taking refuge within the gates of the city in what appears to be a doomed last stand. The Muslims' leader will be the Mahdi, last of the caliphs, Muhammad ibn Abdullah al Qahtani.  Coming to their rescue will be Jesus. Having never died on the cross but ascended bodily into heaven where his aging process was arrested and he did not die, he will now descend onto earth, "wearing saffron robes" and borne by two angels. Arriving at the white minaret of the Umayyad Mosque in Damascus" he will hurry to Jerusalem and without announcing himself, appear during dawn prayers.

"In hushed voices" the assembling Muslims will identify Jesus and point him out to each other. As the caliph/Mahdi is about to lead prayers, he will ask Jesus to lead them instead. Exhibiting modesty, Jesus will decline the invitation and take a place in the rows behind the Mahdi, praying like any other Muslim.
The Anti-Christ will flee, attempting to escape, but "in his ignominious scramble, will melt away, like salt in water. But before he disappears, Jesus will ... pierce him fatally with his spear", and raise the bloody spear above his head. Their leader defeated, supporters of the Anti-Christ "will surrender and submit to the rule of the Mahdi". With Jesus proving to Christians  the falsity of their religion and ordering them to follow Islam, Christianity will come to an end. Any Christians and Jews "who persist in disbelief" will no longer be able to get by paying  Jizya, but will be killed.  Stones and trees will assist Muslim warriors seeking to uncover "any Jews cowering behind them, vainly wishing to escape death," as in the hadith related by al-Bukhari and Muslim. 

Following this victory, there will be 40 years of "glorious" Jesus-Mahdi rule, until the menace of Gog and Magog escapes from the iron wall that has confined them inside a mountain in Central Asia for thousands of years. They will kill multitudes, invading Iraq and Palestine like a pestilence, draining rivers and the Sea of Galilee with their thirst and consuming crops with their hunger. Finally God will command "an insect or worm" to burrow into their necks and kill them or by "fire and a plague of worms, birds and/or other natural disasters".

Gog and Magog's bodies will rot and stink before being washed away by rain. And various other tribulations will take place before the world is finally destroyed. Humanity will be surrounded by fire. Few Arabs will survive the devastation, and most of the survivors will be 'Romans'.  At the end of time, even the Muslims will die, their lives taken by a wind that will be either "horrendous",  or a "breeze bearing a pleasant scent", leaving only the wicked to face the Earth's destruction. On the last day of earth, the sun will rise in the west and God will stop accepting repentance.

Signs in Shi'i Islam
Sa'id Akhtar Rizvi
At least one Shia scholar (Sayyid Sa'id Akhtar Rizvi, 1927–2002 CE) divides the signs into categories similar to lesser/minor and greater/major although he does not use those terms: 
Signs "connected with the general [bad] behaviour of the society", or "Signs of the Re-appearance of the 12th Imam";
'the acts of God' rather than human society, appearing "just before Qiyamat" and "culminating in Qiyamat".

Shi'i apocalyptic accounts differ from Sunni, their hadith including not only reported sayings of the prophet Muhammad but also the twelve Imams. Al-Shaykh Al-Mufid (c. 948–1022 CE)   directed collection of Shi'i hadith giving apocalyptic accounts "greater detail and assurance".
Signs of the Re-appearance of the 12th Imam
Akhtar Rizvi quotes a hadith of Muhammad shortly before his death just after completing the Farewell Pilgrimage, reported by Ibn Abbas.
He gives a long list of some "of the Signs of the Hour", many like those in Sunni hadith, including: 
 "people will neglect the prayer (i.e., will not pray at all, or will pray without fulfilling its conditions, or will not pray in the preferred time), 
 people "will follow their own views (and desires will supersede the commands of God, they will follow only those rules which will appeal to them, and will leave other rules),
 people "will respect the wealthy people (forgetting the Islamic criterion of honour, i.e., piety), 
 people "will sell the religion for worldly benefits (for example, the greed of worldly riches will instigate them to go to such places where, they very well know, it would be difficult to observe their religious commands); at that time the heart and soul of the believer will melt (from grief) as salt melts in water, because he will see the unlawful things (and actions) and will not be able to change them.”
 "the evil will become virtue, and the virtue will become evil; the embezzlers will be trusted, and the trustworthy people will be thought untrustworthy; and the liars will be vouchsafed, and the truthful one will be considered liars.”
 "at that time, women will be rulers and the concubines will be consulted; (Rizvi speculates that this  "may mean" the government is dominated by women and /or  women dominate their husbands - "so much so that the husbands will not, or cannot, ask them to remain within the limits of the Shariat, leaving them free to go wherever they want in whatever clothes they like)".
 "at that time males will satisfy their lust with males; and females will satisfy their lust with females; and minor boys will be mounted upon like women; and the males will liken themselves to females (i.e, will look like females); and females will look like males (Rizvi interprets this to mean "The clean-shaved faces and long hair" of men, and wearing of "pants and bell-bottoms" by women "are proof of the fulfilment of this forecast); and females will ride the saddles (i.e, not only horses, but according to Rizvi bicycles, scooters and motor-cycles). So there will be Curse of God upon those women of my Ummat.”
 at that time will appear female singers and musical instruments (according to Rizvi 'will appear' means will be openly used'), and will rule upon them most evil of my Ummat (worst people will rule upon the Muslims).
 "there will be rains at wrong times"; 
 people "will like chess and gambling apparatus and musical instruments;
 they "will dislike enjoining the good and forbidding the evil; so much so that the (true) believer will, at that time, have less respect than a slave-girl"; 
 "the reciters (of the Qur'an) and those who spend their time in worshipping God, will blame each other".
"Acts of God" culminating in Qiyamat
Rizvi quotes a hadith reported by Hudhaifah bin Usaid al-Ghifari where Muhammad says Qiyamat "will not stand (it will not come) until you see ten signs before it”. These include many of the major signs found in Sunni Islam but not all:
 The smoke;
 Dajjal (the AntiChrist);
 Dabbatul-Ard (the Beast of the Earth);
 Rising of the sun from its setting place (i.e. the West);
 coming down of Isa, son of Maryam;
 Gog and Magog;
 three land-slides [khasf], one in the East; 
 another in the West;
 one in Arabian peninsula;
 a Fire which will appear from Yemen and will turn the people towards their Mahshar, i.e. the gathering place of the Qiyamat.”

Al-Shaykh Al-Mufid
Some of the Shi'a  signs  disseminated by Al-Shaykh Al-Mufid are the same or similar to those described by Sunni Muslims:
 The sun will rise in the West;
 The infidels will seem to triumph;
 An abundance of false messiah's will aggravate chaos;
But others will be different. The return of the Mahdi will be heralded by:
 Eclipses during Ramadan; 
 A plague of locusts;
 A flood of the Euphrates into the streets of Kufa where it will cause the wall of the great mosque to crumble.
 A rain of "reddish fire" will fall on Baghdad and Kufa;
 Syria will be devastated by fighting among "Arab rebels" from Egypt, "cavalrymen stationed in Al-Hira", and a surprising attack from Khurasan "beneath black banners";
 The Turks will occupy Kazora, the middle valley of the Euphrates;
 at the same time the Byzantines will attack the Palestinian city of Ramla;
 "Twenty four successive storms" will rid Muslims of miasmas from "the red death and the white death" the previous strife produced.

Five signs of Shi'i traditionalists
Scholar of Islamic Eschatology, Jean-Pierre Filiu, has identified "five signs" (al-alamat al-khams) of the Mahdi's appearance from anthologies of Shi'i traditionalists:
 the return of the Sufyani, who is "the Mahdi's sworn enemy", and "identified with Umayyad tyranny"; 
 in response to the Sufyani, "the Yemini"—the Mahdi's ally and "implacable" enemy of the Sufyani—will rise up against him;
 there will be a "Call" -- "a heavenly rallying cry of the partisan's of the Mahdi"—and in response a "demoniacal roar" from the bowels of the earth by his enemies, going back and forth for one entire month of Ramadan;
 "the Pure Soul", a messenger of the Mahdi, will be assassinated;
 an army sent against the Mahdi, will be swallowed up by the earth when a crack (khasf) opens up beneath it.

Mahdi Muntazir Qa'im
According to "Shi'ite narrations" by Mahdi Muntazir Qa'im in Al-Islam.org, the "ten signs" (although it lists fewer than ten) that must be seen before Resurrection Day will occur are:
sunrise from the West, 
al-Dajjal and 
the beast of the earth, 
three lunar eclipses on the earth, one in the East, 
one in the West and 
one in the Arabian Peninsula and 
the emergence of Jesus the son of Mary (‘a)

Sunni and Shia perspectives on the Mahdi

Raj`a (Return)
Raj`a in Islamic terminology, refers to the Second Coming, or the return to life of a given past historical figure after that person's physical death. Shia believe that the Mahdi will return,  or more properly "reappear" (zuhur) with a group of chosen companions, having been alive but hidden in "occultation" since the year 874 CE.   But at the same time,  a group  of "immensely wicked disbelievers" will also appear.
According to the Shia scholar Sayyid Murtadha: 
“After the reappearance of Hadhrat Mahdi (a.s.), the Exalted God (s.w.t.) shall cause group of those, who had previously departed from the world, to return to this world in order that they may be partners in the reward and glory of assisting him (a.s.) and in witnessing God's rule over the entire world; He shall also cause the most obstinate enemies to return in order to extract revenge from them.”

The return of the historical figures of Jesus and the Mahdi will signify the beginning of the Last Judgment and establish justice for those who were oppressed in their lifetime up until their death. The oppressors will be punished directly by the oppressed during this future reappearance.

Raj'a is mentioned in some Sunni works where  the return of numerous people is cited, such as the Seven Sleepers, synchronous with the appearance of the Mahdi. According to Jalaluddin Al-Sayuti, in contrast to Shia belief, the return of  Muhammad is not limited to a specific time in the future. Al-Sayuti did not mention if any other religious figures will return after death before the resurrection. According to Abu 'Abdullah Al-Qurtubi, raj`a is understood to be the lack of physical presence of a prophet, who marks his apparent death by absence in the physical world but will reappear, from time to time, to those who are pure in heart.

See also
 Islamic eschatology
 Judgement Day in Islam
 Jannah
 Jahannam
 Final Judgement
 Eschatology

References

Notes

Citations (of hadith)

More citations

Bibliography

Further reading
 "Fath al-Bari" (from Sahih al-Bukhari by ibn Hajar al-Asqalani).
 Esposito, John, The Oxford Dictionary of Islam, Oxford University Press, 2003, .
 Richard C. Martin, Said Amir Arjomand, Marcia Hermansen, Abdulkader Tayob, Rochelle Davis, John Obert Voll, Encyclopedia of Islam and the Muslim World, MacMillan Reference Books, 2003, .
 Lawson, Todd (1999). Duality, Opposition and Typology in the Qur'an: The Apocalyptic Substrate.     Journal of Quranic Studies. 10: 23–49.